Andrew Peter Wypych (born December 5, 1954) is a Polish-born prelate of the Roman Catholic Church.  He has served as an auxiliary bishop and episcopal vicar of the Archdiocese of Chicago since 2011.

Biography

Early life and education
Andrew Wypych was born in Kazimierza Wielka, Poland on December 5, 1954. to Henryka Luty and Julian Wypych.  He had one brother who died in infancy.  Wypych first attended the primary school in Dobieszowice then the secondary school, Liceum Ogólnokształcące, in Działoszyce.  Wypych then entered the Major Seminary of the Archdiocese of Kraków. In 1973, Wypych started his studies at the Papal Academy of Theology in Kraków, receiving a Bachelor of Philosophy degree in 1975 and a Master of Theology degree in 1979,  On May 6, 1978, Wypych was ordained a deacon by then Cardinal Karol Wojtyła.

Ordination and ministry
On April 29, 1979, Wypych was ordained to the priesthood by Cardinal Franciszek Macharski for the Archdiocese of Kraków in Poland. After his ordination, he served as an associate pastor in Kozy, Poland.  In 1981, Wypych was transferred to a parish in Jawiszowice, Poland.

In April 1983, Wypych moved to Illinois temporarily to be closer to his mother as he did not have other close family in Poland.  He was assigned to Five Holy Martyrs Parish in Chicago. At the end of 1983, he was transferred to St. Giles Parish in Oak Park, Illinois.  In 1985, Wypych became associate pastor of St. Ladislaus Parish in Chicago.  Starting in July 1986, he went to St. Pancratius Parish in Chicago. 

Having decided to stay in Chicago because of the need for priests, Wypych requested incardination, or transfer, to the Archdiocese of Chicago, which was granted in 1989.  In 1996, he began serving also as pastor of Five Holy Martyrs Parish, an assignment that lasted until 1999.  Wypych remained at St. Pancratius for 16 years as associate pastor, parochial administrator and pastor.  In 2002, Wypych was appointed pastor of St. Francis Borgia Parish in Chicago.  During this same time period, he also served as dean of Deanery IV-D and as a member of the Archdiocesan College of Consultors.

Auxiliary Bishop of Chicago
On June 13, 2011, Pope Benedict XVI named Wypych as an auxiliary bishop of the Archdiocese of Chicago and titular bishop of Naraggara. He received his episcopal consecration on August 10, 2011 from Cardinal Francis George, with Bishop Józek Guzdek and Archbishop Gustavo Garcia-Siller as co-consecrators. As an auxiliary bishop, Wypych serves as episcopal vicar for Vicariate V.

See also

 Catholic Church hierarchy
 Catholic Church in the United States
 Historical list of the Catholic bishops of the United States
 List of Catholic bishops of the United States
 Lists of patriarchs, archbishops, and bishops

References

External links
 Roman Catholic Archdiocese of Chicago

Episcopal succession

 

1954 births
Living people
Polish Roman Catholic titular bishops
Polish emigrants to the United States
Roman Catholic Archdiocese of Chicago
Christianity in Chicago
21st-century American Roman Catholic titular bishops
Religious leaders from Illinois
People from Kazimierza County